A potentiometer is a three-terminal resistor with a sliding or rotating contact that forms an adjustable voltage divider. If only two terminals are used, one end and the wiper, it acts as a variable resistor or rheostat.

The measuring instrument called a potentiometer is essentially a voltage divider used for measuring electric potential (voltage); the component is an implementation of the same principle, hence its name.

Potentiometers are commonly used to control electrical devices such as volume controls on audio equipment. Potentiometers operated by a mechanism can be used as position transducers, for example, in a joystick. Potentiometers are rarely used to directly control significant power (more than a watt), since the power dissipated in the potentiometer would be comparable to the power in the controlled load.

Nomenclature
Some terms in the electronics industry used to describe certain types of potentiometers are:

 Slide pot or slider pot: a potentiometer that is adjusted by sliding the wiper left or right (or up and down, depending on the installation), usually with a finger or thumb
 thumb pot or thumbwheel pot: a small rotating potentiometer meant to be adjusted infrequently by means of a small thumbwheel
 trimpot or trimmer pot: a trimmer potentiometer typically meant to be adjusted once or infrequently for "fine-tuning" an electrical signal

Construction 

Potentiometers consist of a resistive element, a sliding contact (wiper) that moves along the element, making good electrical contact with one part of it, electrical terminals at each end of the element, a mechanism that moves the wiper from one end to the other, and a housing containing the element and wiper.

Many cheap potentiometers are constructed with a resistive element (B in cutaway drawing) formed into an arc of a circle usually a little less than a full turn and a wiper (C) sliding on this element when rotated, making electrical contact. The resistive element can be flat or angled.  Each end of the resistive element is connected to a terminal (E, G) on the case.  The wiper is connected to a third terminal (F), usually between the other two.  On panel potentiometers, the wiper is usually the center terminal of three. For single-turn potentiometers, this wiper typically travels just under one revolution around the contact. The only point of ingress for contamination is the narrow space between the shaft and the housing it rotates in.

Another type is the linear slider potentiometer, which has a wiper which slides along a linear element instead of rotating. Contamination can potentially enter anywhere along the slot the slider moves in, making effective sealing more difficult and compromising long-term reliability. An advantage of the slider potentiometer is that the slider position gives a visual indication of its setting. While the setting of a rotary potentiometer can be seen by the position of a marking on the knob, an array of sliders can give a visual impression of settings as in a graphic equalizer or faders on a mixing console.

The resistive element of cheap potentiometers is often made of graphite. Other materials used include resistance wire, carbon particles in plastic, and a ceramic/metal mixture called cermet.
Conductive track potentiometers use conductive polymer resistor pastes that contain hard-wearing resins and polymers, solvents, and lubricant, in addition to the carbon that provides the conductive properties.

Multiturn potentiometers are also operated by rotating a shaft, but by several turns rather than less than a full turn. Some multiturn potentiometers have a linear resistive element with a sliding contact moved by a lead screw; others have a helical resistive element and a wiper that turns through 10, 20, or more complete revolutions, moving along the helix as it rotates. Multiturn potentiometers, both user-accessible and preset, allow finer adjustments; rotation through the same angle changes the setting by typically a tenth as much as for a simple rotary potentiometer.

A string potentiometer is a multi-turn potentiometer operated by an attached reel of wire turning against a spring, allowing it to convert linear position to a variable resistance.

User-accessible rotary potentiometers can be fitted with a switch which operates usually at the anti-clockwise extreme of rotation. Before digital electronics became the norm such a component was used to allow radio and television receivers and other equipment to be switched on at minimum volume with an audible click, then the volume increased, by turning a knob. Multiple resistance elements can be ganged together with their sliding contacts on the same shaft, for example, in stereo audio amplifiers for volume control. In other applications, such as domestic light dimmers, the normal usage pattern is best satisfied if the potentiometer remains set at its current position, so the switch is operated by a push action, alternately on and off, by axial presses of the knob.

Others are enclosed within the equipment and are intended to be adjusted to calibrate equipment during manufacture or repair, and not otherwise touched. They are usually physically much smaller than user-accessible potentiometers, and may need to be operated by a screwdriver rather than having a knob. They are usually called "preset potentiometers" or "trim[ming] pots". Some presets are accessible by a small screwdriver poked through a hole in the case to allow servicing without dismantling.

Resistance–position relationship: "taper" 

The relationship between slider position and resistance, known as the "taper" or "law", is controlled by the manufacturer. In principle any relationship is possible, but for most purposes linear or logarithmic (aka "audio taper") potentiometers are sufficient.

A letter code may be used to identify which taper is used, but the letter code definitions are not standardized. Potentiometers made in Asia and the USA are usually marked with an "A" for logarithmic taper or a "B" for linear taper; "C" for the rarely seen reverse logarithmic taper. Others, particularly those from Europe, may be marked with an "A" for linear taper, a "C" or "B" for logarithmic taper, or an "F" for reverse logarithmic taper. The code used also varies between different manufacturers. When a percentage is referenced with a non-linear taper, it relates to the resistance value at the midpoint of the shaft rotation.  A 10% log taper would therefore measure 10% of the total resistance at the midpoint of the rotation; i.e. 10% log taper on a 10 kOhm potentiometer would yield 1 kOhm at the midpoint. The higher the percentage, the steeper the log curve.

Linear taper potentiometer 
A linear taper potentiometer (linear describes the electrical characteristic of the device, not the geometry of the resistive element) has a resistive element of constant cross-section, resulting in a device where the resistance between the contact (wiper) and one end terminal is proportional to the distance between them.  Linear taper potentiometers are used when the division ratio of the potentiometer must be proportional to the angle of shaft rotation (or slider position), for example, controls used for adjusting the centering of the display on an analog cathode-ray oscilloscope. Precision potentiometers have an accurate relationship between resistance and slider position.

Logarithmic potentiometer 
A logarithmic taper potentiometer is a potentiometer that has a bias built into the resistive element. Basically this means the center position of the potentiometer is not one half of the total value of the potentiometer. The resistive element is designed to follow a logarithmic taper, aka a mathematical exponent or "squared" profile.
A logarithmic taper potentiometer is constructed with a resistive element that either "tapers" in from one end to the other, or is made from a material whose resistivity varies from one end to the other.  This results in a device where output voltage is a logarithmic function of the slider position.

Most (cheaper) "log" potentiometers are not accurately logarithmic, but use two regions of different resistance (but constant resistivity) to approximate a logarithmic law. The two resistive tracks overlap at approximately 50% of the potentiometer rotation; this gives a stepwise logarithmic taper. A logarithmic potentiometer can also be simulated (not very accurately) with a linear one and an external resistor.  True logarithmic potentiometers are significantly more expensive.

Logarithmic taper potentiometers are often used for volume or signal level in audio systems, as human perception of audio volume is logarithmic, according to the Weber–Fechner law.

Contactless potentiometer 
Unlike mechanical potentiometers, non-contact potentiometers use an optical disk to trigger an infrared sensor, or a magnet to trigger a magnetic sensor (as long as there are other types of sensors, such as capacitive, other types of non-contact potentiometers can probably be built), and then an electronic circuit does the signal processing to provide an output signal that can be analogue or digital.

An example of a non-contact potentiometer can be found with the AS5600 integrated circuit.  However, absolute encoders must also use similar principles, although being for industrial use, certainly the cost must be unfeasible for use in domestic appliances.

Rheostat 

The most common way to vary the resistance in a circuit continuously is to use a rheostat. It is basically used to adjust magnitude of current in a circuit by changing length. The word rheostat was coined about 1845 by Sir Charles Wheatstone, from the Greek  rheos meaning "stream", and - -states (from  histanai, " to set, to cause to stand") meaning "setter, regulating device", which is a two-terminal variable resistor. For low-power applications (less than about 1 watt) a three-terminal potentiometer is often used, with one terminal unconnected or connected to the wiper.

Where the rheostat must be rated for higher power (more than about 1 watt), it may be built with a resistance wire wound around a semi-circular insulator, with the wiper sliding from one turn of the wire to the next. Sometimes a rheostat is made from resistance wire wound on a heat-resisting cylinder, with the slider made from a number of metal fingers that grip lightly onto a small portion of the turns of resistance wire. The "fingers" can be moved along the coil of resistance wire by a sliding knob thus changing the "tapping" point. Wire-wound rheostats made with ratings up to several thousand watts are used in applications such as DC motor drives, electric welding controls, or in the controls for generators. The rating of the rheostat is given with the full resistance value and the allowable power dissipation is proportional to the fraction of the total device resistance in circuit. Carbon-pile rheostats are used as load banks for testing automobile batteries and power supplies.

Digital potentiometer 

A digital potentiometer (often called digipot) is an electronic component that mimics the functions of analog potentiometers.  Through digital input signals, the resistance between two terminals can be adjusted, just as in an analog potentiometer. There are two main functional types: volatile, which lose their set position if power is removed, and are usually designed to initialise at the minimum position, and non-volatile, which retain their set position using a storage mechanism similar to flash memory or EEPROM.

Usage of a digipot is far more complex than that of a simple mechanical potentiometer, and there are many limitations to observe; nevertheless they are widely used, often for factory adjustment and calibration of equipment, especially where the limitations of mechanical potentiometers are problematic. A digipot is generally immune to the effects of moderate long-term mechanical vibration or environmental contamination, to the same extent as other semiconductor devices, and can be secured electronically against unauthorised tampering by protecting the access to its programming inputs by various means.

In equipment which has a microprocessor, FPGA or other functional logic which can store settings and reload them to the "potentiometer" every time the equipment is powered up, a multiplying DAC can be used in place of a digipot, and this can offer higher setting resolution, less drift with temperature, and more operational flexibility.

Membrane potentiometers 
A membrane potentiometer uses a conductive membrane that is deformed by a sliding element to contact a resistor voltage divider. Linearity can range from 0.50% to 5% depending on the material, design and manufacturing process. The repeat accuracy is typically between 0.1 mm and 1.0 mm with a theoretically infinite resolution.  The service life of these types of potentiometers is typically 1 million to 20 million cycles depending on the materials used during manufacturing and the actuation method; contact and contactless (magnetic) methods are available (to sense position). Many different material variations are available such as PET, FR4, and Kapton. Membrane potentiometer manufacturers offer linear, rotary, and application-specific variations. The linear versions can range from 9 mm to 1000 mm in length and the rotary versions range from 20 to 450 mm in diameter, with each having a height of 0.5 mm. Membrane potentiometers can be used for position sensing.

For touch-screen devices using resistive technology, a two-dimensional membrane potentiometer provides x and y coordinates. The top layer is thin glass spaced close to a neighboring inner layer. The underside of the top layer has a transparent conductive coating; the surface of the layer beneath it has a transparent resistive coating. A finger or stylus deforms the glass to contact the underlying layer. Edges of the resistive layer have conductive contacts.
Locating the contact point is done by applying a voltage to opposite edges, leaving the other two edges temporarily unconnected. The voltage of the top layer provides one coordinate. Disconnecting those two edges, and applying voltage to the other two, formerly unconnected, provides the other coordinate. Alternating rapidly between pairs of edges provides frequent position updates. An analog-to-digital converter provides output data.

Advantages of such sensors are that only five connections to the sensor are needed, and the associated electronics is comparatively simple. Another is that any material that depresses the top layer over a small area works well. A disadvantage is that sufficient force must be applied to make contact. Another is that the sensor requires occasional calibration to match touch location to the underlying display. (Capacitive sensors require no calibration or contact force, only proximity of a finger or other conductive object. However, they are significantly more complex.)

Applications 
Potentiometers are rarely used to directly control significant amounts of power (more than a watt or so). Instead they are used to adjust the level of analog signals (for example volume controls  audio equipment), and as control inputs for electronic circuits. For example, a light dimmer uses a potentiometer to control the switching of a TRIAC and so indirectly to control the brightness of lamps.

Preset potentiometers are widely used throughout electronics wherever adjustments must be made during manufacturing or servicing.

User-actuated potentiometers are widely used as user controls, and may control a very wide variety of equipment functions. The widespread use of potentiometers in consumer electronics declined in the 1990s, with rotary incremental encoders, up/down push-buttons, and other digital controls now more common. However they remain in many applications, such as volume controls and as position sensors.

Audio control 

Low-power potentiometers, both slide and rotary, are used to control audio equipment, changing loudness, frequency attenuation, and other characteristics of audio signals.

The 'log pot', that is, a potentiometer has a resistance, taper, or, "curve" (or law) of a logarithmic (log) form, is used as the volume control in audio power amplifiers, where it is also called an "audio taper pot", because the amplitude response of the human ear is approximately logarithmic. It ensures that on a volume control marked 0 to 10, for example, a setting of 5 sounds subjectively half as loud as a setting of 10. There is also an anti-log pot or reverse audio taper which is simply the reverse of a logarithmic potentiometer. It is almost always used in a ganged configuration with a logarithmic potentiometer, for instance, in an audio balance control.

Potentiometers used in combination with filter networks act as tone controls or equalizers.

In audio systems, the word linear, is sometimes applied in a confusing way to describe slide potentiometers because of the straight line nature of the physical sliding motion. The word linear when applied to a potentiometer regardless of being a slide or rotary type, describes a linear relationship of the pot's position versus the measured value of the pot's tap (wiper or electrical output) pin.

Television 
Potentiometers were formerly used to control picture brightness, contrast, and color response.  A potentiometer was often used to adjust "vertical hold", which affected the synchronization between the receiver's internal sweep circuit (sometimes a multivibrator) and the received picture signal, along with other things such as audio-video carrier offset, tuning frequency (for push-button sets) and so on. It also helps in frequency modulation of waves.

Motion control 
Potentiometers can be used as position feedback devices in order to create closed-loop control, such as in a servomechanism. This method of motion control is the simplest method of measuring the angle or displacement.

Transducers 
Potentiometers  are also very widely used as a part of displacement transducers because of the simplicity of construction and because they can give a large output signal.

Computation
In analog computers, high precision potentiometers are used to scale intermediate results by desired constant factors, or to set initial conditions for a calculation. A motor-driven potentiometer may be used as a function generator, using a non-linear resistance card to supply approximations to trigonometric functions. For example, the shaft rotation might represent an angle, and the voltage division ratio can be made proportional to the cosine of the angle.

Theory of operation 

The potentiometer can be used as a voltage divider to obtain a manually adjustable output voltage at the slider (wiper) from a fixed input voltage applied across the two ends of the potentiometer. This is their most common use.

The voltage across  can be calculated by:

If  is large compared to the other resistances (like the input to an operational amplifier), the output voltage can be approximated by the simpler equation:

Since the load resistance is large compared to the other resistances, the output voltage  will be approximately:

Because of the load resistance, however, it will actually be slightly lower: .

One of the advantages of the potential divider compared to a variable resistor in series with the source is that, while variable resistors have a maximum resistance where some current will always flow, dividers are able to vary the output voltage from maximum to ground (zero volts) as the wiper moves from one end of the potentiometer to the other. There is, however, always a small amount of contact resistance.

In addition, the load resistance is often not known and therefore simply placing a variable resistor in series with the load could have a negligible effect or an excessive effect, depending on the load.

See also 
 Potentiometric sensor
 Trimmer

References

Further reading 
 The Potentiometer Handbook; 1ed; Carl Todd; McGraw-Hill; 300 pages; 1975; . (download)

 Potentiometer caution (Problems); Alpsalpine talks about some care with pots.  (download)

 Contactless potentiometer; The AS5600 is an easy to program magnetic rotary position sensor with a high-resolution 12-bit analog or PWM output. This contactless system measures the absolute angle of a diametric magnetized on-axis magnet. This AS5600 is designed for contactless potentiometer applications; (AS5600)

External links 

 Beginners' Guide to Potentiometers
 Pictures of measuring potentiometers
Electrical calibration equipment including various measurement potentiometers
The Secret Life of Pots - Dissecting and repairing potentiometers
Making a rheostat
Potentiometer calculations as voltage divider - loaded and open circuit (unloaded)
How to build a potentiometer with familiar outputs – and unfamiliar qualities (AS5600 - contactless potentiometer)

Resistive components
Transducers